The Nadiža is a mountain stream near the town of Kranjska Gora, in the far northwestern corner of Slovenia.

The source of the Nadiža is near the Tamar Mountain Lodge; immediately after emerging, the water cascades down the cliff face in a  waterfall, near which the Municipality of Kranjska Gora draws its water. The Nadiža re-emerges through the porous bottom of a two-m deep lake called Zelenci, a marshy wetland with an extraordinarily rich ecosystem, which is regarded as the source of the Sava Dolinka.

References

External links
Satellite image at Google Maps

Rivers of Upper Carniola
Municipality of Kranjska Gora